The 2003 FIBA Europe Under-16 Championship (known at that time as 2003 European Championship for Cadets) was the 17th edition of the FIBA Europe Under-16 Championship. The city of Madrid, in Spain, hosted the tournament. Serbia and Montenegro won the trophy for the fourth time in a row.

Teams

Qualification

There were two qualifying rounds for this tournament. Twenty-four national teams entered the qualifying round. Fifteen teams advanced to the Challenge Round, where they joined Lithuania, Greece and France. The remaining eighteen teams were allocated in three groups of six teams each. The three top teams of each group joined Serbia and Montenegro (title holder), Russia (runner-up) and Spain (host) in the final tournament.

Preliminary round
The twelve teams were allocated in two groups of six teams each.

Group A

Group B

Knockout stage

9th–12th playoffs

Championship

5th–8th playoffs

Final standings

Team roster
Miloš Teodosić, Milenko Tepić, Stefan Nikolić, Marko Durković, Dragan Labović, Nenad Mijatović, Dušan Trajković, Nenad Živčević, Nemanja Aleksandrov, Branko Jereminov, Nikola Dragović, and Boban Medenica.
Head coach: Mijo Kadija.

References
FIBA Archive
FIBA Europe Archive

FIBA U16 European Championship
2002–03 in European basketball
2002–03 in Spanish basketball
International youth basketball competitions hosted by Spain